Casper Verum Nygaard Johansen (born 28 July 1988) is a retired Danish footballer.

In 2007, Johansen made a breakthrough to AC Horsens first team, making several appearances, and on October 28, he scored his first Superliga goal in an away match against FC Nordsjælland. A match which AC Horsens won 2-1.

External links
AC Horsens profile
National team profile
Career statistics at Danmarks Radio

1988 births
Living people
Danish men's footballers
Denmark under-21 international footballers
AC Horsens players
Holstein Kiel players
Danish Superliga players
3. Liga players
Danish expatriate men's footballers
Expatriate footballers in Germany
Danish expatriate sportspeople in Germany
Association football forwards
Middelfart Boldklub players